Ibrahim El-Dessouki was an Egyptian weightlifter. He competed in the men's featherweight event at the 1948 Summer Olympics.

References

External links
 

Year of birth missing
Possibly living people
Egyptian male weightlifters
Olympic weightlifters of Egypt
Weightlifters at the 1948 Summer Olympics
Place of birth missing